Big Brother All Stars 2015 was the fourth season of the all-star spin-off of Big Brother and the seventeenth season of the format in Bulgaria overall. It was announced on November 13, 2015, on the official website. Followed the same air schedule as in 2012, 2013 and 2014, it commenced on Nova Television on 16 November 2015, immediately after the VIP Brother 7 finale and lasted for a month, ended on 14 December 2015. It featured housemates from previous seasons of the show, as well as participants from other reality formats. Desislava Doneva won with Vanja Džaferović "Džafer" as the runner-up.

Housemates
Eight housemates entered the house on Day 1, making it the season with the fewest Housemates so far.

Borislav
Borislav Atanasov was a contestant from The Mole 2. He entered the House on Day 1 and was the third evicted on Day 22.

Desislava

Desislava Doneva was a contestant from VIP Brother 2 where she finished second and Sing with me where she finished third. She entered the House on Day 1 and became a winner on Day 29.

Evgeni
Evgeni Minchev was a contestant from VIP Brother 6. He entered the House on Day 1 and finished third in the finale on Day 29.

Katsi

Katsi Vaptsarov was a contestant from VIP Brother 4 where he finished third and Your Face Sounds Familiar 2 where he finished second. He entered the House on Day 1 and was the second evicted on Day 15.

Sonya
Sonya Koltuklieva was a contestant from VIP Brother 4. She entered the House on Day 1 and was the fourth evicted on Day 24.

Vanja

Vanja Džaferović "Džafer" was a contestant from Survivor 5 where he won. He entered the House on Day 1 and finished second in the finale on Day 29.

Vanya
Vanya Chervenkova was a contestant from VIP Brother 5 where she finished third. She entered the House on Day 1 and finished fourth in the finale on Day 29.

Yoana
Yoana Zaharieva was a contestant from VIP Brother 5. She entered the House on Day 1 and was the first evicted on Day 8.

Houseguests

Svetlozar
Svetlozar Savov "Zarko" is a MMA fighter and former boyfriend of Desislava. He entered the House on Day 15 and left in the finale on Day 29.

Nominations table

Notes

References

External links
 Official website

2015 Bulgarian television seasons
VIP Brother seasons
2015 Bulgarian television series endings